The Iowa Hawkeyes women's basketball team represents the University of Iowa in Iowa City, Iowa, United States. The team is a member of the Big Ten Conference as well as the National Collegiate Athletic Association. The team plays its regular season games at 15,400-seat Carver-Hawkeye Arena, along with men's basketball, wrestling, and volleyball teams.

History
Iowa women's basketball began in 1974, under head coach Lark Birdsong. The first Iowa team finished 5–16 in 1974-75, its first victory over the Minnesota Golden Gophers. Birdsong coached Iowa until 1978-79, which marked Iowa's first winning season. Birdsong was subsequently replaced by Judy McMullen, who led the program for the next four years.  McMullen was succeeded in 1983 by former Cheyney University coach C. Vivian Stringer. Prior to her stay at Iowa, Stringer led the Cheyney Wolves to the 1982 NCAA championship.

Beginning with the 1983–84 season, Naismith Basketball Hall of Fame inductee Stringer coached at Iowa for 12 seasons. In that time, the Hawkeyes won six Big Ten championships, played in nine NCAA Tournaments, and reached the Final Four in 1993. Unprecedented attention was shown to the Hawkeyes under Stringer, as evidenced by the record-setting 22,157 fans that watched Iowa play Ohio State on February 3, 1985, in Carver-Hawkeye Arena.  Stringer, however, left Iowa to coach at Rutgers in 1995, following the death of her husband, Bill.

Angie Lee replaced Stringer, and led the Hawkeyes to a Big Ten championship in her first season. Under Lee, Iowa won another Big Ten title in 1998. In 2000, Lee's successor as head coach was Lisa Bluder. Bluder is Iowa's current women's basketball coach. Under Bluder, the Hawkeyes have won two regular season Big Ten championship and four Big Ten tournament championships.

From 2015 to 2019, Megan Gustafson has played for Coach Bluder and the women’s basketball program at Iowa. Gustafson was named the 2019 National Player of the year, after averaging a double-double of  27.8 points and 13.4 rebounds on 69.9% shooting. The 2018–19 Iowa Hawkeyes women's basketball team had a 29-7 regular season record, winning the Big Ten Conference tournament championship and advancing to the Elite Eight of the 2019 NCAA Division I women's basketball tournament.
The 2021-22 Iowa Women's Basketball team finished the season 24-8 sharing the regular season title with the Ohio State Women's Basketball team. They also won the 2022 Big Ten women's basketball tournament a week later winning games over #7 Northwestern, #6 Nebraska, and 5th seeded Indiana in the Big Ten Championship 74-67. Caitlin Clark was the Big Ten Women's Basketball Tournament's MOP.

NCAA tournament results

Iowa has appeared in 28 NCAA Tournaments with a record of 26-28.

Retired numbers 
The Hawkeyes have retired two jerseys in honor of the women's program, the most recent being Megan Gustafson in 2020.

National award winners 
Naismith Trophy
 Megan Gustafson – 2019

AP Player of the Year
 Megan Gustafson – 2019

USBWA Player of the Year
 Megan Gustafson – 2019

Naismith Coach of the Year
 Lisa Bluder – 2019

Academic All-American of the Year (women's basketball)
 Ally Disterhoft – 2016, 2017
 Caitlin Clark – 2023

Lisa Leslie Award (top D-I center)
 Megan Gustafson – 2019

Nancy Lieberman Award (top D-I point guard)
 Caitlin Clark – 2022

Dawn Staley Award (top D-I point guard)
 Caitlin Clark – 2021, 2022

Tamika Catchings Award (USBWA freshman of the year)
 Caitlin Clark – 2021 (shared with Paige Bueckers of UConn)

WBCA Freshman of the Year
 Caitlin Clark – 2021 (shared with Bueckers)

References

External links